The Cowboy Rides Away: Live from AT&T Stadium is a live album released by George Strait in 2014. The title refers to the fact that this concert was the final performance of his final tour "The Cowboy Rides Away Tour" on June 7, 2014 in Arlington, Texas. 104,793 people were in attendance, the largest ever single-show attendance at a U.S. stadium. An all-star lineup joined Strait on stage. The DVD of the concert was released on November 11. The show was recorded on Remote Recording's Silver Truck by Chuck Ainlay and David Hewitt.

Track listing

Personnel
 Jason Aldean - vocals on "Fool Hearted Memory" and "All My Ex's Live in Texas"
 Ray Benson - vocals on "All My Ex's Live in Texas"
 Kenny Chesney - vocals on "Ocean Front Property" and "All My Ex's Live in Texas"
 Eric Church - vocals on "Cowboys Like Us" and "All My Ex's Live in Texas"
 Sheryl Crow - vocals on "Here for a Good Time" and "All My Ex's Live in Texas"
 Mike Daily - pedal steel guitar
 Gene Elders - fiddle, mandolin
 Thom Flora - backing vocals
 Vince Gill - vocals on "Lovebug" and "All My Ex's Live in Texas"
 Faith Hill - vocals on "A Showman's Life" and "All My Ex's Live in Texas"
 Ronnie Huckaby - piano
 Alan Jackson - vocals on "Murder on Music Row" and "All My Ex's Live in Texas"
 Mike Kennedy - drums
 Miranda Lambert - vocals on "Run" and "All My Ex's Live in Texas"
 Mac McAnally - acoustic guitar
 Benny McArthur - fiddle, acoustic and electric guitars
 Martina McBride - vocals on "Jackson" and "All My Ex's Live in Texas"
 Rick McRae - electric guitar
 Joe Manuel - acoustic guitar
 Marty Slayton - backing vocals
 Bubba Strait - vocals on "Arkansas Dave"
 George Strait - lead vocals, acoustic guitar
 John Michael Whitby - acoustic guitar, keyboards
 Glenn Worf - bass guitar

Chart performance
The album debuted at No. 4 on the Billboard 200, and No. 2 on the Hot Country Albums chart, with 51,000 copies sold for its first week.  The album has sold 351,900 copies in the US as of October 2015.

Weekly charts

Year-end charts

References

2014 live albums
George Strait live albums
MCA Records live albums
Albums produced by Chuck Ainlay